Lozova is a commune in Strășeni District, Moldova. It is composed of two villages, Lozova and Stejăreni. Lozova was fondated about 600 years ago.

People from Lozova
 Alexandru Baltagă, Romanian-Bessarabian priest and anti-Soviet activist
 Victor Spinei, Romanian historian and archaeologist

References

Communes of Strășeni District